Gold clusters in cluster chemistry are gold-derived materials that can either be discrete molecules or larger colloidal particles.  Both types are described as nanoparticles, with diameters of less than one micrometer. A nanocluster is a collective group made up of a specific number of atoms or molecules held together by some interaction mechanism. Gold nanoclusters have potential applications in optoelectronics and  catalysis.

Structure

Bulk gold exhibits a face-centered cubic (fcc) structure. It can be shown that the fcc structure can be extended by a half unit cell in order to make it look like a cuboctahedral structure. The cuboctahedral structure maintains the cubic-closed pack and symmetry of fcc. This can be thought of as redefining the unit cell into a more complicated cell. Each edge of the cuboctahedron represents a peripheral Au–Au bond. The cuboctahedron has 24 edges while the icosahedron has 30 edges; the transition from cuboctahedron to icosahedron is favored since the increase in bonds contributes to the overall stability of the icosahedron structure.

The centered icosahedral cluster  is the basis of constructing large gold nanoclusters.  is the endpoint of atom-by-atom growth. The icosahedral motif is found in many gold clusters through vertex sharing ( and ), face-fusion ( and ), and interpenetrating biicosahedrons (and ). Large gold nanoclusters can essentially be reduced to a series of icosahedrons connecting, overlapping, and/or surrounding each other. The crystallization process of gold nanoclusters involves the formation of surface segments that grow towards the center of the cluster. The cluster assumes an icosahedral structure because of the associated surface energy reduction.

Discrete gold clusters
Well-defined, molecular clusters are known, invariably containing organic ligands on their exteriors. In order to generate naked gold clusters for catalytic applications, the ligands must be removed, which is typically done via a high-temperature ( or higher) calcination process, but can also be achieved chemically at low temperatures (below ), e.g. using a peroxide-assisted route.

Colloidal clusters
Gold clusters can be obtained in colloid form.  Such colloids often occur with a surface coating of alkanethiols or proteins.  Such clusters can be used in immunohistochemical staining.  Gold metal nanoparticles (NPs) are characterized by an intense absorption in the visible region, which enhances the utility of these species for the development of completely optical devices. The wavelength of this surface plasmon resonance (SPR) band depends on the size and shape of the nanoparticles as well as their interactions with the surrounding medium. The presence of this band enhances the utility of gold nanoparticle as building blocks for devices for data storage, ultrafast switching, and gas sensors. Whilst plasmonic gold nanoparticles only exhibit electric moments, clusters of such particles can exhibit magnetic moments making them of great interest for use in optical metamaterials

Gas-phase clusters
Evidence has been presented for the existence of hollow golden cages with the partial formula  with n = 16 to 18.  These clusters, with diameter of 550 picometres, are generated by laser vaporization and characterized by photoelectron spectroscopy. Using mass spectrometry, the unique tetrahedral structure of  has been confirmed.

Catalysis

Similarly gold clusters implanted on  can oxidize  at temperatures as low as 40K. Catalytic activity correlated with the structure of gold nanoclusters. A strong relationship between energetic and electronic properties with size and structure of gold nanoclusters.

See also
Thiolate-protected gold cluster
Bismuth cluster

References

Further reading

External links
 

Cluster chemistry
Gold compounds